Needle Rock Natural Area is located at the western edge of the West Elk Mountains of Colorado. The surrounding terrain is characterized by laccolithic mountains flanked by precipitous cliffs, extensive talus aprons, forested mesas, canyons, and spacious, well-watered intermontane basins. The massive rock feature originated in the Oligocene geological epoch when magma intruded between existing sedimentary rocks as the crown of a buried laccolith or possibly the underlying conduit of a laccolith. Subsequent erosion has exposed the prominent rock formation seen in the natural area today.

The Needle Rock Natural Area is managed by the Bureau of Land Management.

See also

West Elk Mountains
List of Colorado mountain ranges
List of Colorado mountain summits
List of Colorado fourteeners
List of Colorado 4000 meter prominent summits
List of the most prominent summits of Colorado
List of Colorado county high points

References

External links
Needle Rock Article - summitpost.org

West Elk Mountains
Mountains of Delta County, Colorado
Protected areas of Delta County, Colorado
Mountains of Colorado
North American 2000 m summits